HMS Dangereuse was a tartane named Duguay-Trouin that the French Navy requisioned in May 1794 to serve as an aviso. The Navy renamed her Dangereuse either in May 1795 or on 2 March 1796. She was one of a flotilla of seven gun-vessels that Commodore Sir Sidney Smith in  took at Acre on 18 March 1799, all of which the British took into service. At capture Dangereuse carried six guns and had a crew of 23 men. Smith put her under the command of Lieutenant Robert William Tyte (acting).

The gun-vessels were carrying siege artillery and other siege supplies to reinforce Napoleon's troops besieging Acre. Smith immediately put the guns and supplies to use to help the denizens of the city resist the French, and the gun-vessels to harass them.

The gun-vessels were of shallower draft and so could come in closer. Together, they helped repel repeated French assaults. The French attacked some 40 times between 19 March and 10 May before Napoleon finally gave up. On 21 May he destroyed his siege train and retreated back to Egypt, having lost 2,200 men dead, 1,000 to the plague.

After Napoleon's failure at Acre, Smith sailed with his squadron on 12 June. He proceeded first to Beruta road, and then to Larnica road, Cyprus, in order to refit his little squadron. He and Tigre then departed for Constantinople; the gun-vessels remained in the theatre.

Dangereuse next served in the Egyptian campaign of 1801 where, together with the gunboat Janissary and the cutter , she protected the right flank during the landing of troops in Aboukir Bay.

Dangereuse was sold later that same year. In 1850 the Admiralty awarded the Naval General Service Medal with clasp "Egypt" to claimants from the crews of the vessels that had served in the navy's Egyptian campaign between 8 March 1801 and 2 September, including Dangereuse.

Notes

Citations

References
 
 
 
 

Ships of the Royal Navy
Captured ships
Ships of the French Navy
1790s ships